Little Brown Bushrat is a children's book by writer and illustrator Georgie Ripper, that tells the story of a little brown bushrat discovering that he has special talent. The book is the winner of The Macmillan Prize for Children's Illustration in 2000.

Little Brown Bushrat was initially published in 2002 in the United Kingdom by Macmillan Children's Books as a 32-page hardback edition, was followed by a paperback edition. It was penned for readers aged three to seven, and is 546 words long.

Plot
The protagonist is a little brown bushrat. All the animals in the bush have an exciting talent – the kangaroo can jump the highest, the emu can run the fastest and the duck-billed platypus is the best swimmer. But the little brown bushrat thinks he cannot do anything . . . until he is given a chance to save the day.

Recognition
The book is the winner of The Macmillan Prize for Children's Illustration in 2000.

References

2002 children's books
British children's books
British picture books
Australia in fiction